A series of ICC World Cricket League tournaments were played between 2017 and 2019 and were the last tournaments of the World Cricket League. There were four divisions, numbered two to five. The divisions were played in roughly consecutive order, with the lower divisions played first. The top two from each division will gain promotion to the following, higher division, meaning that some teams will play in more than one division during the tournament.

Following the conclusion of these tournaments, the World Cricket League was replaced by the ICC Cricket World Cup League 2 and the ICC Cricket World Cup Challenge League. This tournament was used to determine which teams qualified for which of these two competitions, which are a direct part of the 2023 Cricket World Cup qualification process. It was the fourth and last time the World Cricket League was used for Cricket World Cup qualification.

Tournaments summary

Tournament results

References

 
2017-19